Joaquim Germano Pinto Machado Correia da Silva (16 June 1929 – 14 March 2011) was the 124th Governor of Macau from 15 May 1986 to 8 July 1987.

Biography
As a physician, he was the first Governor of Macau who was not a military general. He advocated humanism and social welfare during his term of office and visited Guangzhou as well as the entire Guangdong province from 22–24 February 1987. He resigned from office in May 1987, giving rise to the rumour that his resignation was related to corruption.

See also
 Portuguese Macau

References

1929 births
2011 deaths
Governors of Macau
People from Porto
Humanists